Calotes geissleri is a species of agamid lizard. It is found in Myanmar and India.

References

Calotes
Lizards of Asia
Reptiles of India
Reptiles of Myanmar
Reptiles described in 2021
Taxa named by Wolfgang Böhme (herpetologist)
Taxa named by Morris Flecks
Taxa named by Timo Hartmann
Taxa named by Andreas Schmitz
Taxa named by Philipp Wagner